Cymindis rivularis is a species of ground beetle in the subfamily Harpalinae. It was described by Victor Motschulsky in 1844.

References

rivularis
Beetles described in 1844